Don Jaffe (or Jaffé) (born 24 January 1933) is a German-Israeli-Latvian musician and composer.

Biography

Family 
Jaffe was born in 1933 in Riga, Latvia, to Ella Jaffe who had attended a German business school in Riga, and Jakov Jaffe, who had studied electrical engineering in Berlin. After his studies, Jakov Jaffe returned to Riga. In 1941, when the German Wehrmacht conquered Latvia, the Jaffe family – Jakov, Ella, Don, and his two siblings – had to flee to Siberia.

After World War II, the Jaffes decided to return to Riga. All their relatives who couldn’t escape to the Soviet Union were murdered. In 1956, Don Jaffe married Elza Jaffe, born Peterson. They have two children: Ramon (born  1962, a cellist) and Diana (born 1969), a book author and expert in gender marketing). Since 1975, Don Jaffe has lived in Bremen.

Career 
At the age of fourteen, Jaffe started to learn Cello at the Emīls Dārziņš Music School, the junior music conservatory in Riga. In 1951, he was the first string player to graduate from this music school. Jaffe finished his studies there in only four years instead of the regular ten. From 1951 to 1956 he studied Cello at the Jāzeps Vītols Latvian Academy of Music in Riga.

After graduation, Jaffe worked as a soloist and chamber musician and gained international success. Jaffe also taught chamber music at the Jāzeps Vītols Latvian Academy of Music and cello the Emīls Dārziņš Music School.

Pushed by growing antisemitism in the Soviet Union, Don Jaffe and his family emigrated to Israel in 1971. Jaffe immediately received a position at the Jerusalem Symphony Orchestra and started teaching cello at the Jerusalem Academy of Music and Dance (then Rubin Academy of Music). In the Yom-Kippur-War, Jaffe volunteered for the Israeli Defence Forces.

In 1974, the Jaffes moved to Germany, where, as Don Jaffe put it, „their cultural roots lie“. Jaffe started to work as a solo cellist at the Berlin Symphony Orchestra. In 1975, Jaffe became a member of the Bremen Philharmonic Orchestra. From 1976 to 1992 he taught cello at the Bremen University of the Arts. In 1985, the Senate of Bremen, which is the state government of Bremen, appointed Jaffe as chamber musician.

Composer 
In 1997, Jaffe started to work as a composer. His works are influenced by both his biography and Jewish history and often focus on the Holocaust and its victims. “It’s my mission to create musical monuments,“ Jaffe said. But he also stresses: “The generation of the grandchildren is not responsible for the evil deeds of their ancestors.“

Works 
 Passionen, Sonata for violoncello solo, 1997
 Shoa, Sonata for violoncello solo, 1997
 Serefinas Träume, Sonatino for violoncello and piano, 1998
 Darum siehe, die Zeit wird kommen, String trio, 1999
 Todesfuge, Poem by Paul Celan, for violoncello, organ, and choir, 200
 Lior, Sonatino for violoncello and piano, 2002
 Prolog zu Rabbi von Bacherach after Heinrich Heine, for violoncello and voice, 2002
 Saulkrasti, fantasy suite for violoncello and harp, 2003
 Die letzten Tage, Suite for violoncello and violin, 2004
 Ballade über die Forelle und das Leben des Franz Schuberts, for violoncello, violin, and harp, 2006
 Via dolorosa ebraica, Sonata for violoncello and piano, 2007
 Durch die Zeit, for violoncello and organ, 2008
 Choro-Symphonie, for choir and violoncello, 2008
 Anni horribili, chamber symphony, 2010
 Symphonie El sueno de la razón produce monstruos (The Sleep of Reason Produces Monsters) after Francisco de Goya, symphony orchestra, 2011
 Exodus 1971, chamber symphony for cello, piano, and string orchestra, 2011
 Symphonischer Roman, double concert for viola, cello, and orchestra, 2012
 Perlenlicht, Sonatina for harp solo, 2014
 Triple Concerto for Violin, cello, and piano, 2016
 "Gefühle mit Brahms“, Viola, cello, and piano, 2017
 Concerto for Harp and cello, 2018

Notes

References

 Baltische Rundschau: Der deutsch-jüdische Cellist und Komponist Don Jaffé im Interview: 2013. 
 Sigrid Schuer: Geburtstagskonzert für Don Jaffé im Sendesaal. Weser-Kurier, 24 January 2013. 

German cellists
Israeli cellists
Latvian cellists
Jewish classical musicians
20th-century classical composers
21st-century classical composers
German composers
Israeli composers
Latvian composers
Musicians from Bremen
Musicians from Riga
German Jews
Israeli Jews
Latvian Jews
Naturalized citizens of Germany
Citizens of Israel through Law of Return
Holocaust survivors
1933 births
Living people
20th-century cellists
21st-century cellists